The 1999–2000 Arkansas Razorbacks men's basketball team represented the University of Arkansas in the 1999–2000 college basketball season. The head coach was Nolan Richardson, serving for his 15th year. The team played its home games in Bud Walton Arena in Fayetteville, Arkansas. Arkansas won its first ever SEC Tournament championship, earning the conferences automatic bid to the NCAA Tournament. Sophomore guard Brandon Dean was the SEC Tournament MVP. Freshman forward Joe Johnson was named to the SEC All-Freshman Team and was named the SEC Rookie of the Year. Arkansas lost to the Miami, FL Hurricanes in the first round of the NCAA Tournament. 

Arkansas
Arkansas
Arkansas Razorbacks men's basketball seasons
Razor
Razor